Gaudenzio Ferrari (c. 1471 – 11 January 1546) was an Italian painter and sculptor of the Renaissance.

Biography
Gaudenzio was born to Franchino Ferrari at Valduggia in the Valsesia in the Duchy of Milan. Valduggia is now in the Province of Vercelli in Piedmont. He is said to have first learned the art of painting at Vercelli from Gerolamo Giovenone. He subsequently studied in Milan, in the school of the Cathedral artisan Giovanni Stefano Scotti, and perhaps alongside Bernardino Luini.  Circa 1504 he proceeded to Florence. It was once thought that he later moved to Rome. He died in Milan.

Gaudenzio was not related to Defendente Ferrari (c.1490–1535) a painter from Chivasso, nor to Eusebio Ferrari (1508–1533) the painter from Vercelli.

Mature work
His initial pictorial style may be considered as derived mainly from the old Milanese school, which had imbibed the classic influence of Leonardo and pupils such as Bramantino. However, the provincial impetus was also strong, as is demonstrated in his emotive work at the Sacro Monte of Varallo.

By 1513, Gaudenzio had depicted the life of Christ in a fresco at Santa Maria delle Grazie in Varallo Sesia. He returned to work in the chapels of the Sacro Monte di Varallo by 1524. The chapels are dispersed over a hilltop sanctuary, connected by a winding path, and containing a combination of diorama and wax museum with life-size terracotta figures. He executed his most memorable work, a fresco of the Crucifixion (pictured right), with a multitude of figures, no less than twenty-six of them being modelled in actual relief, and colored; on the vaulted ceiling are lamenting angels. The figures include goitrous bestial assailants.

There are other works which show flashes of innovation such as the crowded chorus decorating duomo of Santa Maria dei Miracoli in Saronno or his fresco of St Anne. This painting shows the overlap of Milanese realism and Venetian colorism.

He was a very prolific painter, distinguished by strong animation. In general character, his work suggests more the 15th than the 16th century. His subjects were always religious. Andrea Solario, Giovanni Battista Cerva, Gian Paolo Lomazzo, and Fermo Stella were his principle students.

Selected works

Sant'Anna Altarpiece (Galleria Sabauda and National Gallery, London)
Pietà, in the Royal Gallery, Turin
St Catharine Miraculously Saved from the Torture of the Wheel, Brera Gallery, Milan
Frescoes in church of Santa Maria della Pace, Milan.
Virgin with Angels and Saints under an Orange Tree, Cathedral, Vercelli
Last Supper, Refectory of San Paolo
Birth of the Virgin, Annunciation, Visitation, Adoration of the Shepherds and Kings, Crucifixion, Assumption of the Virgin (1532–1535), Church of San Cristoforo
St Paul Meditating, Louvre, Paris
Presentation in the Temple, Christ among the Doctors, History of Christ (1507),  Convent of the Minorites, Varallo.
Adoration (after 1527), Santa Maria di Loreto, near Varallo
Glory of Angels (1535), Dome of the Santa Maria dei Miracoli, Saronno
Scourging of Christ, Ecce Homo and Crucifixion (1542), Santa Maria delle Grazie, Milan

Notes

References

External links

HALTADEFINIZIONE by HAL9000 S.r.l. – High Resolution Photos, an 8.6GP Scan of the Parete Gaudenziana that was the largest digital photo in the world when it was produced
Gaudenzio Ferrari at www.wga.hu, Web Gallery of Art

1470s births
1546 deaths
People from Valduggia
15th-century Italian painters
Italian male painters
16th-century Italian painters
Painters from Milan
15th-century Italian sculptors
Italian male sculptors
16th-century Italian sculptors
Catholic sculptors